The Daily Ittefaq (translit. Doinik Ittefak) is a Bengali-language daily newspaper. Founded in 1953, it is the oldest newspaper, and one of the most circulated newspapers in Bangladesh. This newspaper format is broadsheet and is printed by Ittefaq Group of Publications Limited.

Pre-1971
The Weekly Ittefaq  was first published on December 24, 1949 by Yar Mohammad Khan, its founders and publishers and also the founders and treasurers of Bangladesh Awami League. As both were actively involved politics and the Bengali nationalist movement, they appointed Tofazzal Hossain, who was working in Kolkata at the time, as an editor of Kolkata-based The Daily Ittehad, published by Huseyn Shaheed Suhrawardy. Following a legal dispute with the original owners in which Tofazzal Hossain won Manik Mia was declared owner of the publishing license of the Weekly Ittefaq. Tofazzal Hossain subsequently acquired a new license under the name  of The Daily Ittefaq.

During the time of united Pakistan, it publicized the negligence and colonial mindset of Pakistan leaders to East Pakistan. As a result, the government acted against its editors and journalists. Tofazzal Hossain's post editorial column ‘Rajnaitik Mancha’ (political platform) became popular in East Pakistan. During the Bengali Language Movement era, The Daily Ittefaq played a vital role. Ittefaq had a significant role in the 1954 general elections, and it contributed to the victory of the United Front. Ittefaq always strongly opposed all military rule of Pakistan starting from Ayub Khan to Yahya Khan.

The Ittefaq supported the Six Point Program of Awami League during the mid-1960s and helped publish its ideas. Ittefaq quickly emerged as the voice of East Pakistan citizens. President Ayub Khan censored its publication from June 17 to July 11, 1966, and then again from July 17, 1966 to February 9, 1969. Tofazzal Hossain was imprisoned several times.

Hossain died on June 1, 1969; the newspaper was subsequently managed by his two sons, Mainul Hosein and Anwar Hossain Manju.

Role in Liberation War of Bangladesh
The Ittefaq office was burnt down and completely demolished on March 25, 1971 by the Pakistan Army as part of Operation Searchlight. It was all in ruins and there was not a sign of life there. The newspaper received Taka 100,000 (equivalent to £8,300 in 1971) as compensation from the Pakistan government. This enabled Barrister Mainul Hosein to resume publishing, under the watchful eye of the authorities, on May 21, 1971 from the Daily Pakistan Press. For the remainder of the Bangladesh Liberation War the paper was a mouthpiece for Yahya and Tikka Khan, and severely criticised the freedom fighters.

After the newspaper The Daily Sangram called Serajuddin Hossain, (also transliterated Seraj Uddin Hossain), executive editor Daily Ittefaq, the editor was abducted December 10, 1971 and never found. During Bangladesh's war crimes trials in 2012, Ali Ahsan Mohammad Mojaheed, a Jamaat-e-Islami party member, was charged with Hossain's murder.

Present
Ownership was returned to Manik Mia's sons after nationalization on August 24, 1975. Tasmima Hossain is the editor. Ittefaq features all the standard sections of a modern daily newspaper like political news, economic, sports, education, entertainment, and general and local news.

Online edition
This newspaper offers a daily Bengali electronic edition on its website and an English edition aimed at a younger audience.

This news portal has also E-paper.

See also
 List of newspapers in Bangladesh

References

Bengali-language newspapers published in Bangladesh
Daily newspapers published in Bangladesh
Newspapers established in 1953
1953 establishments in East Pakistan
Newspapers published in Dhaka